Malpora, also known as Malpur, is a village in the Bomai block of Sopore tehsil of Baramulla district in the Kashmir Valley of Jammu and Kashmir, India. The residents of Malpora are mostly from middle-class families with well-versed education. Kashmiri is the local language.

Geography
Malpora is situated Under the foothills of Mujnar Hills in the Narvaw Valley. This village is 13 kilometers away from Baramulla Town.

References

Villages in Baramulla district